St. Andrew's Church is a Roman Catholic church located in Westland Row, Dublin, Republic of Ireland.  Construction started in 1832, it opened for public worship in 1834 but was not completed until 1837.

History
The architect appointed to design the church was John Bolger. However, he used the plans for a previous church, in Townsend Street, which had been designed by James Leeson. Assistance was received from Francis Johnston and James Lever. The roof was by Richard Turner. The exterior of the church has a Doric portico with a statue of St. Andrew, sculpted by John Smyth (1776-1840), son of Edward Smyth (d.1812), sculptor of the Riverine heads at the Custom House.

On 7 January 1940 ornamentation fell from the ceiling, which prompted an investigation and refurbishment. This started in 1942 when the interior was renovated and painted. All sculptures were restored at the same time.

Dominic Corrigan (1802-1880), a noted physician, is buried in the crypt of the church.

Organ
The organ of St. Andrew's was built by John White of Dublin in 1872. It is a large three manual instrument which originally contained many ranks of orchestral Cavaille-Coll pipework. However, during the 1976 rebuild a large number of these were lost in favor of more neo-classical stops. 

The organist of St. Andrew's since October 2011 is Aleksandre Nisse.

Gallery

References and sources

Notes

Sources

George Newenham Wright An Historical Guide to the City of Dublin

Churches of the Roman Catholic Archdiocese of Dublin
Roman Catholic churches in Dublin (city)
Greek Revival architecture in Ireland
Neoclassical church buildings in Ireland